Antonio Berti may refer to:
 Antonio Berti (politician) (1812–1879), Italian politician and senator
 Antonio Berti (painter) (1830–1912), Italian painter
 Antonio Berti (sculptor) (1904–1990), Italian sculptor and medalist

See also
 Tony Berti (born 1972), former professional American football player